This is a list of the England national under-21 football team results from 2020 to the present (Matches 382 onwards).

2020s

2020

2021

2022

2023

Notes

Under-21 association football